Bernard Harvey (born August 17, 1985), known professionally as Harv, is an American record producer, musician and songwriter from Kansas City, Kansas and based in Los Angeles, who has produced acclaimed work for major recording artists such as Justin Bieber, Skrillex, Cherish, Summer Walker, Normani, Post Malone, Gucci Mane, Eminem and Omah Lay.

Early years
Bernard Harvey was born and raised in Kansas City, Kansas. Harv was introduced to the musical arts at the age of nine, and began playing the bass by age twelve. He attended J.C. Harmon High School (graduating in 2003) where his love for music elevated joining the marching band, jazz band and playing different types of music all around the city. He has instruction in the piano, guitar, drums, trombone, and tuba, but is best known for his mastery of the bass.

In 2003, Harv's talent on the bass was recognized with a scholarship at Alabama State University where he obtained a degree in Music Technology and where he also pledged Kappa Alpha Psi fraternity. He began playing in church and local bands, which led him to expanding his interest in production and music composition. After graduating from college, Harv moved to Atlanta, where he worked in recording studios and played at nightclubs.

Career
As Harv began making connections in Atlanta in 2007, he quickly established a friendship with Grammy-nominated producer Shondrae "Bangladesh" Crawford, subsequently playing bass guitar on a few major placements produced by Crawford such as "Lemonade" by Gucci Mane and "A Kiss" by Bad Meets Evil.

In 2009, Harv began playing the bass for Scooter Braun's artist, Justin Bieber, during his radio show tour and in 2010 he became his bassist for the My World Tour. After catching wind that Harv also produced music, Braun expressed his interest in signing Harv as a producer to his publishing company. Harv signed his first publishing deal with Braun's Sheba Publishing and Universal Music Publishing Group (UMPG) in 2011. In 2020, he signed a new publishing deal with Brandon Silverstein's S10 Publishing.

Harv continued to perform and tour with Bieber, and ahead of the 2016 Purpose World Tour, Harv was promoted to music director where he took on a bigger role on Bieber's team collaborating with him behind-the-scenes and on stage. From penning R&B and pop hits to working on live shows, his hands-on role had been largely dependent on in-person interactions.

His first time working with Bieber was on his first Christmas album, Under the Mistletoe in 2011, including “Fa La La,” (a Bieber collaboration with Boyz II Men), in which HARV co-wrote and co-produced. Other more recent notable co-productions for Bieber include “Somebody,” “Forever” (featuring Post Malone & Clever), and “Rockin’ Around the Christmas Tree.”

Harv produced three songs on Justin Bieber's February 2020 album, Changes: "Available", "At Least For Now" and "Forever", featuring Post Malone and Clever, which debuted at number 1 on the Billboard 200 chart. In February 2020, HARV earned his debut position on Billboard's Top R&B Producers Chart for his work on Bieber's single "Forever," which reached number 24 on the Billboard Hot 100.

In 2021, HARV produced the song "Peaches", featuring Daniel Caesar and Giveon on Justin Bieber's 2021 album, 'Justice'. The song debuted at number one on the Billboard Hot 100 and the album also debuted at number one on the Billboard 200. The single 'Peaches' also earned HARV five nominations for the 64th Annual Grammy Awards, including breaking the Grammy record for most credited writers on a track nominated for Song of the Year. Harv was also featured in the 2021 Amazon documentary Justin Bieber: Our World and Bieber's March 2021 NPR Tiny Desk Concert series performance. Later in 2021, Harv also produced Bieber, Skrillex, and Don Toliver's single, "Don't Go", as well as, Bieber and Juice Wrld's single, "Wandered to LA". Harv was honored as Variety's Hitmaker of the Month in October 2021 and their 2021 Hitmakers Impact List for his work on Bieber's song "Peaches".

Personal life
Harv met Felisha King Harvey, known as one of the members of the R&B group Cherish, in 2014 during a studio session. They married on April 18, 2021, in Los Angeles, CA and were featured on an episode of Million Dollar Listing Los Angeles season thirteen in October 2021. The couple are both credited collaborators on Justin Bieber's song "Peaches", as well as Normani's single, "Fair".

Production discography

Album placements
{|class=wikitable
|-
! Artist
! Album/Song
! Credit
|-
| colspan="4"  style="text-align:center; background:#f2f3f4;"| 2011
|-
| Justin Bieber
| Under the Mistletoe<ref>[http://albumcredits.com/Album/2504011#/Album/ProductionCredits/2504011 'Under the Mistletoe"]  AlbumCredits.com. Retrieved 25 August 2012</ref>
| Composer, producer
|-
| Justin Bieber featuring Jaden Smith
| Happy New Years| Producer
|-
| colspan="4"  style="text-align:center; background:#f2f3f4;"| 2012
|-
| Justin Bieber
| Believe: "Just Like Them (Deluxe), "Fairytale" (Spotify)
| Composer, producer
|-
| Kandi Burruss
| '"Be Alright" (used in Kandi Factory pilot)
| Producer
|-
| Legaci
| Driven: "All Because of You"
| Composer, producer
|-
| colspan="4"  style="text-align:center; background:#f2f3f4;"| 2016|-
| Sevyn Streeter
| "Before I Do" (Girl Disrupted)
| Composer, producer
|-
| colspan="4"  style="text-align:center; background:#f2f3f4;"| 2017|-
| Sevyn Streeter
| "Peace Sign" (featuring Dave East) (Girl Disrupted)
| Composer, producer
|-
| Brenda Mada
| '"House Party" 
| Producer
|-
| Juke Ross
| "Colour Me"
| Composer, producer
|-
| Omarion
| "Open Up"
| Composer, producer
|-
| colspan="4"  style="text-align:center; background:#f2f3f4;"| 2019|-
| Poo Bear
| "Yes Please" 
| Composer, producer
|-
| Summer Walker
| "Anna Mae" (Open Up)
| Composer, producer
|-
| colspan="4"  style="text-align:center; background:#f2f3f4;"| 2020|-
| Justin Bieber
| "Available" (Changes)
| Composer, producer
|-
| Justin Bieber
| "Forever" (featuring Post Malone & Clever) (Changes)
| Composer, producer
|-
| Justin Bieber
| "At Least for Now" (Changes)
| Composer, producer
|-
| colspan="4"  style="text-align:center; background:#f2f3f4;"| 2021|-
| Justin Bieber
| "Peaches" (featuring Daniel Caesar & Giveon) (Justice)
| Composer, producer
|-
|Justin Bieber
|"Somebody" (Justice)
|Composer, producer
|-
|Ai
|"Expectations" (It's All Me, Vol. 2)
|Producer
|-
| colspan="4" style="text-align:center; background:#f2f3f4;"|2022'|-
|Ai
|"First Time" (Dream)
|Producer
|
|-
|Normani
|"Fair"
|Producer
|
|}

Bass guitarist

Concert tours

Film and TV placements
Movie featuresJustin Bieber: Never Say Never (2011)

Television appearances
 The Tonight Show with Jay Leno (2011, 2012)
 The Ellen DeGeneres Show (2011, 2012)
 The Oprah Winfrey Show (2011)
 The View (2011, 2012)
 The Today Show (2011, 2012)
 Justin Bieber: Never Say Never (2011)
 All Around the World NBC special (2012)
 Dick Clark's New Year's Eve show (2011)
 MTV Video Music Awards (2011)
 Teen Choice Awards (2011)
 Disney Christmas Parade (2011)
 The David Letterman Show (2011, 2012)
 Saturday Night Live'' (2020)

Notes

References

1985 births
Living people
American male composers
21st-century American composers
American male songwriters
Record producers from Kansas
American male bass guitarists
21st-century American bass guitarists
21st-century American male musicians